Marcella is a Roman cognomen and Italian given name, the feminine version of Marcello (Mark in English).  Marcella means warlike, martial, and strong. It could also mean 'young warrior'. The origin of the name Marcella is Latin.

Marcella may refer to:

People
 Saint Marcella (325–410), saint in the Roman Catholic Church and Eastern Orthodox Church
 Saint Markella, 14th century saint in the Greek Orthodox Church
 Claudia Marcella, women of the Marcelli branch of the Roman gens Claudia

As a given name
 Marcella Albani (1899–1959), Italian actress
 Marcella Alsan, American medical scientist and economist
 Marcella Althaus-Reid (1952–2009), Argentinian Methodist theologian and author
 Marcella Bella (born 1952), Italian singer
 Marcella Detroit (born 1952), American singer, musician, songwriter
 Marcella Hazan (1924–2013), Italian-born American cookbook author
 Markella Kavenagh, Australian actress
 Marcella Michelangeli (born 1943), Italian actress and singer
 Marcella Nunez-Smith, American physician
 Marcella L. Williams, convicted murderer

Arts and entertainment
 Marcella (play), a 1789 play by William Hayley
 Marcella (novel), an 1894 novel by Mary Augusta Ward
 Marcella (Giordano), a 1907 opera by Umberto Giordano
 Marcella (1921 film), an Italian film directed by Carmine Gallone
 Marcella (film), a 1937 Italian film directed by Guido Brignone
 "Marcella" (song), a 1972 song by the Beach Boys
 Marcella (album), a 1982 album by Marcella Detroit
 Marcella (TV series), a British Nordic-noir detective series

Other uses
 Marcella, another term for piqué (weaving), a white cotton material used for evening shirts and waistcoats
 Marcella, Arkansas
 Marcella, Mississippi

See also
 Marcellina (disambiguation)

Italian feminine given names
Latin feminine given names